Nathan Begaye (1969–2010) was a Native American ceramics artist of Navajo and Hopi descent.

Background
Nathan Begaye was born in Phoenix, Arizona in 1969 to a Navajo father and a Hopi mother. He was raised by his maternal grandparents in the Third Mesa and Tuba City, Arizona. His aunt was noted Hopi potter Otellie Loloma. His upbringing in the Navajo/Hopi communities was steeped in tribal traditions, and he was schooled in the lore, history, religion, symbolism, and customs of the Navajo and Hopi peoples.

Art career
Begaye's interest in pottery began early, at age 10, and he had his first public exhibition only one year later. He learned traditional techniques and pigment recipes from people in his tribal community, both Navajo and Hopi. As they were tribal secrets, he kept these to himself even when he became a teacher later in life. After receiving a SWAIA scholarship, he left home at age 14 to study ceramics at the Institute of American Indian Arts (IAIA) in Santa Fe, NM.

Although his upbringing was very conservative, Begaye used unexpected and unorthodox techniques in his work. Said to utilize a "maverick sense of form, texture, color, and design," Begaye's work was often personal and autobiographical.

Notable collections
Peabody Essex Museum, Salem, MA
Robert Nichols Gallery, Santa Fe, NM
Emerging Clouds, 1998 and Cloud, 2004 and untitled large jar, 2004, SM's-Stedelijk Museum 's-Hertogenbosch/NL

Selected Exhibition History
Native American Art at the Museum of Fine Arts, Boston
Museum of Fine Arts, Boston, MA
November 20, 2010 – December 31, 2016

Passionate Journey: The Grice Collection of Native American Art
Mint Museum of Art, Charlotte, NC
July 18, 2009 – October 17, 2009

Intersections: Native American Art in a New Light
Peabody Essex Museum, Salem, MA
June 24, 2006 – November 27, 2011

Free Spirit: The New Native American Potter
Stedelijk Museum’s, Hertogenbosch, Netherlands
2006

Dualities: Nathan Begaye + Les Namingha + Dusty Naranjo
Museum of Contemporary Native Arts, Santa Fe, NM
May 12, 2006 – June 25, 2006

American Indian Art at the Spencer Museum of Art
Spencer Museum of Art, University of Kansas,Lawrence, KS
September 6, 2003 - October 19, 2003

Indian Market: New Directions in Southwestern Native American Pottery
Peabody Essex Museum, Salem, MA
November 16, 2001 – March 17, 2002

References

See also
Diego Romero (artist)

1969 births
2010 deaths
Native American potters
Artists from Arizona
Navajo artists
Hopi people
American contemporary artists
21st-century ceramists
20th-century Native Americans
21st-century Native Americans